Janet Mahoney is an English actress who has appeared in film, theatre and television roles. She appeared in several films, including Doctor in Trouble (1970), Carry On Loving (1970) and Mutiny on the Buses (1972). Her London stage roles included Carry on London, Cockie!, Anything Goes, The Maid of the Mountains, Ann Veronica, Come Spy with Me, and Irene. She was also in episodes of the television series Dad's Army and Up Pompeii!.

References

English television actresses
English film actresses
Living people
1938 births